Kabumpo, the Elegant Elephant of Pumperdink, is a fictional character in the Oz books of Ruth Plumly Thompson.

History
Kabumpo first appears in Kabumpo in Oz, Thompson's second Oz book. He was originally a christening gift to the king of Pumperdink, Pompus.

He reappears to play major roles in The Lost King of Oz, The Purple Prince of Oz, and The Silver Princess in Oz. He had a less consequential role in The Wishing Horse of Oz. Thompson's illustrator John R. Neill made Kabumpo a denizen of the Emerald City, attended by Ojo, in his contributions to the series. In 1980 Eloise Jarvis McGraw and Lauren Lynn McGraw borrowed the character for The Forbidden Fountain of Oz, published by the International Wizard of Oz Club.

Kabumpo is known for his wisdom in Pumperdink, but that might be because he shines in comparison with other members of the court. He is overbearing, sarcastic, and extremely vain, but good-hearted.

Since the expiration of his first novel's copyright on 1 January 1998 (the last Thompson book to enter the public domain before the Copyright Extension Act took hold), Kabumpo may be used freely by any author. Of his Thompsonian appearances, only Purple Prince remains under copyright, with the expiration date being 1 January 2028.

References

Literary characters introduced in 1922
Elephants in literature
Kabumpo
Animals of Oz
Fictional elephants
Male characters in literature